Sidhpur is one of the 182 Legislative Assembly constituencies of Gujarat state in India. It is part of Patan district. It is numbered as 19-Sidhpur.

List of segments
This assembly seat represents the following segments,

 Sidhpur Taluka
 Patan Taluka (Part) Villages – Ajuja, Muna, Khareda, Untvada, Amarpura, Vahana, Bhatsan, Koita, Raviyana, Khodana, Katrasamal, Mesar, Haidarpura, Delvada, Ganeshpura, Abalouva, Jangral, Vasni, Jakha, Lakshmipura, Endla, Kanosan, Morpa, Vagdod, Vachhalva, Lakhdap, Bhilvan, Renchavi, Vadhi, Charup, Vadu, Siyol, Vamaiya, Kimbuva, Kotavad, Sanodarda.

Members of Legislative Assembly
2007 - Jay Narayan Vyas, Bharatiya Janata Party
2012 - Balvantsinh Rajput, Indian National Congress

Election results

2022 
 

-->

2017

2012

References

External links
 

Assembly constituencies of Gujarat
Patan district
Siddhpur